Mohammad Nazifuddin bin Mohammad Najib (born 1983) is a Malaysian businessman, the son of Najib Razak, the former Prime Minister of Malaysia. On 24 July 2019, the government had filed a tax evasion lawsuit through the Inland Revenue Board (IRB), against Nazifuddin to claim RM37.6 million in unpaid taxes since 2011 till 2017. On 18 May 2021, Nazifuddin has been served a bankruptcy notice for failing to pay income tax amounting to RM37.6 million as ruled by the High Court in July 2020.

Early life
He started a degree in computer science at the University of Nottingham, but soon changed to study international business at American Intercontinental University in 2002, where he obtained a bachelor's degree. He then enrolled at Cass Business School at City University.

Controversies and issues

Panama Papers
Nazifuddin has been named in the Panama Papers, and has responded that he is no longer involved in the two companies involved in the data leak.

Nazifuddin further stated, "I held directorships in two companies based in the British Virgin Islands (BVI): Jay Marriot International and PCJ International Venture Limited. These companies were incorporated by the international law firm Mossack Fonseca," and that he had transferred all of his Jay Marriot shares to fellow director Ch'ng Soon Sen's sister and had resigned in 2011, and that PCJ was shut down a year after its 2013 foundation and had had no business transactions.

Wining and dining with Taiwanese actress in Taipei
On 5 July 2018, Nazifuddin had set social media on fire after he was spotted wining and dining Taiwanese actress Celia Chang in Taipei. Taiwanese portal Apple Daily said the pair were seen dining at a steakhouse and having a massage at a top luxury shopping district near Taipei 101.

DAP's Iskandar Puteri MP Lim Kit Siang has weighed into Nazifuddin wining and dining with Celia Zhang.

It is the prerogative of Nazifuddin as a private person to travel to Taiwan, said Pemantau Malaysia Baru president Lokman Noor Adam.

RM37.6 million in unpaid taxes
On 24 July 2019, the government had filed a tax evasion lawsuit through the Inland Revenue Board (IRB), against Nazifuddin to claim RM37.6 million in unpaid taxes since 2011 till 2017.

On 2 March 2020, Nazifuddin failed to obtain a stay on the RM37.6 million tax suit against him.

On 6 July 2020, the High Court has allowed an application for summary judgment to be entered in the IRB suit to recover RM37.6 million in unpaid taxes from Nazifuddin.

References

1982 births
Living people
Malaysian people of Malay descent
Malaysian Muslims
Malaysian businesspeople
People named in the Panama Papers
Children of prime ministers of Malaysia